Osroene or Osrhoene was an ancient region and state in Upper Mesopotamia. The Kingdom of Osroene, also known as the "Kingdom of Edessa" ( / "Kingdom of Urhay"), according to the name of its capital city (now Şanlıurfa, Turkey), existed from the 2nd century BC, up to the 3rd century AD, and was ruled by the Abgarid dynasty. Generally allied with the Parthians, the Kingdom of Osroene enjoyed semi-autonomy to complete independence from the years of 132 BC to AD 214. Though ruled by a dynasty of Arab origin, the kingdom's population was mainly Aramean, with a Greek and Parthian admixture. In addition, the city's cultural setting was fundamentally Aramaic, alongside strong Parthian influences, though some Arab cults were also attested at Edessa.

The ruling Abgarid dynasty was deposed by the Romans during the reign of Roman Emperor Caracalla (211–217), probably in 214 or 216, and Osroene was incorporated as a province, but it was briefly reestablished during the reign of Roman emperor Gordianus III (238-244). Christianity came early to Osroene. From 318, Osroene was a part of the Diocese of the East. By the 5th century, Edessa had become a main center of Syriac literature and learning. In 608, the Sasanian emperor, Khosrow II (590–628), took Osroene. It was briefly reconquered by the Byzantines, but in 638 it fell to the Arabs as part of the Muslim conquests.

Background and context

Osroene, or Edessa, was one of several states that acquired independence from the collapsing Seleucid Empire through a dynasty of the nomadic Nabataean Arab tribe from Southern Canaan and North Arabia, the Osrhoeni, from 136 BC. Osroene's name either derives from the name of this tribe, or from Orhay (Urhay), the original Aramaic name of Edessa. Arab influence had been strong in the region.

Osroene endured for four centuries, with twenty-eight rulers occasionally named "king" on their coins. Most of the kings of Osroene were called Abgar or Manu and settled in urban centers.

Osroene was generally allied with the Parthian Empire. After a period under the rule of the Parthian Empire, it was absorbed into the Roman Empire in 114 as a semiautonomous vassal state, and incorporated as a simple Roman province in 214. There is an apocryphal legend that Osroene was the first state to have accepted Christianity as state religion, but there is not enough evidence to support that claim.

Population and culture

Though most of Osroene's rulers were from the Abgarid dynasty of Arab origin, the kingdom's population was mainly Aramean, with a Greek and Parthian admixture. In addition, though Arab cults were attested at Edessa (the twins Monimos and Azizos), its cultural setting was fundamentally Aramaic, alongside strong Parthian influences. Thus, according to Maurice Sartre: "It would hence be absurd to regard Edessa as solely an Arab city, for its culture owed very little to the nomadic Arabs of the region". Later, within the Roman Empire, Edessa was the most important center of Syriac Christianity. Under the Nabataean dynasties, Osroëne became increasingly influenced by Syriac Christianity, and was a centre of local reaction against Hellenism.

In his writings, Pliny the Elder refers to the natives of Osroene and the Kingdom of Commagene as Arabs and the region as Arabia. Abgar II is called "an Arab phylarch" by Plutarch, while Abgar V is described as "king of the Arabs" by Tacitus.

The Edessene onomastic contains many Arabic names. The most common one in the ruling dynasty of Edessa being Abgar, a well-attested name among Arabic groups of antiquity. Some members of the dynasty bore Iranian names, while others had Arab names. Judah Segal notes that the names ending in "-u" are "undoubtedly Nabatean". The Abgarid dynasts spoke "a form of Aramaic".

It was in the region in which the legend of Abgar V originated.

In Roman sources
The area of the kingdom was perhaps roughly coterminous with that of the Roman province of Osrhoene. The great loop of the Euphrates was a natural frontier to the north and west. In the south Batnae was capital of the semi-autonomous principality of Anthemusia until its annexation by Rome, in AD 115. The eastern boundary is uncertain; it may have extended to Nisibis or even to Adiabene in the first century AD. Ḥarrān, however, only 40 km south of Edessa, always maintained its independent status as a Roman colonia.

Edessa, the capital of the ancient kingdom, was a fortress of considerable strength and a staging post both large and nearest to the Euphrates. It was an important road junction; an ancient highway, along which caravans carried merchandise from China and India to the West, meeting there a north-south road connecting the Armenian Highlands with Antioch. Inevitably, Edessa figured prominently on the international stage.

In 64 BC, as Pompey waged war on the Parthian Empire, Abgar II of Osrhoene had sided with the Romans when Lucius Afranius occupied Upper Mesopotamia. The king was initially an ally of the Roman general Marcus Licinius Crassus in his campaign against the Parthians in 53 BC, but Roman historians allege that he betrayed Crassus by leading him to deviate from his safe route along the river and instead into an open desert, where the troops suffered from the barrenness and thus were vulnerable to cavalry attack. Abgar is said to have met with Surenas, the Parthian general, and informed him of the Roman movements. The enormous and infamous Battle of Carrhae followed and destroyed the entire Roman army. Just prior to the battle, Abgar made a pretext to ride away. However, modern historians have questioned whether Abgar intended to betray the Romans and instead may have simply been leading them along an old Arab trade route. According to a Syriac source, Abgar died later that year.

In the early 2nd century AD, King Abgar VII joined the Emperor Trajan's campaign into Mesopotamia and entertained him at court. The king later rebelled against the Romans, however, which led to the Roman general Lucius Quietus sacking Edessa and putting an end to Osrhoene's independence in 116. In 123, during the reign of Hadrian, the Abgarid dynasty was restored with the installation of Ma'nu VII, and Osroene was established as a client kingdom of the Empire. After the Roman–Parthian War of 161–166 under Marcus Aurelius, forts were built and a Roman garrison was stationed in Nisibis. In 195, following a civil war in which the kingdom had supported his rival Pescennius Niger, Septimius Severus mounted an invasion and annexed the territory as a new province, making Nisibis the capital. However, the emperor did allow the king, Abgar XI, to retain the city of Edessa and a small territory surrounding it. In 213, the reigning king was deposed by Caracalla, and the remaining territory was incorporated into the Roman province of Osroene.

According to legends (without historical justification), by 201 AD or earlier, under King Abgar the Great, Osroene became the first Christian state. It is believed that the Gospel of Thomas emanated from Edessa around 140. Prominent early Christian figures have lived in and emerged from the region such as Tatian the Assyrian, who came to Edessa from Hadiab (Adiabene). He made a trip to Rome and returned to Edessa around 172-173. Tatian was the editor of the Diatessaron, which was the primary sacred text of Syriac-speaking Christianity until in the 5th century the bishops Rabbula and Theodoret suppressed it and substituted a revision of the Old Syriac Canonical Gospels (as in the Syriac Sinaiticus and Curetonian Gospels).

Then, Edessa was again brought under Roman control by Decius and it was made a center of Roman operations against the Sasanian Empire. Amru, possibly a descendant of Abgar, is mentioned as king in the Paikuli inscription, recording the victory of Narseh in the Sassanid civil war of 293. Historians identify that Amru as Amru ibn Adi, the fourth king of the Lakhmids, which was then still based in Harran, not yet moved to al-Hirah in southern Mesopotamia.

Many centuries later, Dagalaiphus and Secundinus duke of Osrhoene, accompanied Julian in his war against the Sasanian emperor, Shapur II, in the 4th century.

Roman province

It was a frontier province, lying close to the Persian empires with which the Romans were repeatedly at war, and was taken and retaken several times. As it was on the frontier it had a Roman legion stationed there. Legio III Parthica and its Castrum (homebase) may have been Rhesaina, but that is uncertain.

Following Emperor Diocletian's tetrarchy reform during his reign (284-305), it was part of the diocese of the East, in the praetorian prefecture of the same name.

According to the late-4th-century Notitia Dignitatum, it was headed by a governor of the rank of praeses, and it was also the seat of the dux Mesopotamiae, who ranked as vir illustris and commanded (c. 400) the following army units:
Equites Dalmatae Illyriciani, garrisoned at Ganaba.
Equites Promoti Illyriciani, Callinicum.
Equites Mauri Illyriciani, Dabana.
Equites Promoti indigenae, Banasam
Equites Promoti indigenae, Sina Iudaeorum.
Equites Sagittarii indigenae, Oraba.
Equites Sagittarii indigenae, Thillazamana.
Equites Sagittarii indigenae Medianenses, Mediana.
Equites Primi Osrhoeni, Rasin.
Praefectus legionis quartae Parthicae, Circesium.
(an illegible command, possibly Legio III Parthica), Apatna.
as well as, 'on the minor roll', apparently auxiliaries:
Ala Septima Valeria Praelectorum, Thillacama.
Ala Prima Victoriae, Tovia -contra Bintha.
Ala Secunda Paflagonum, Thillafica.
Ala Prima Parthorum, Resaia.
Ala Prima nova Diocletiana, inter Thannurin et Horobam.
Cohors Prima Gaetulorum, Thillaamana.
Cohors Prima Eufratensis, Maratha.
Ala Prima Salutaria, Duodecimo constituta.

According to Sozomen's Ecclesiastical History, "there were some very learned men who formerly flourished in Osroene, as for instance Bardaisan, who devised a heresy designated by his name, and his son Harmonius. It is related that this latter was deeply versed in Grecian erudition, and was the first to subdue his native tongue to meters and musical laws; these verses he delivered to the choirs" and that Arianism, a more successful heresy, met with opposition there.

Rulers

See also

Edessa
Arameans
Aramaic language
Syriac language
Syria (region)
Diocese of the Orient

References

Sources

External links
Notitia dignitatum

 
States and territories established in the 2nd century BC
States and territories disestablished in the 3rd century
Ancient Armenia
Post-Imperial Assyria
Parthian Empire
132 BC
130s BC establishments
Roman client kingdoms
Roman buffer states
Edessa
Former kingdoms
Christian states